Torrent Systems, originally named Applied Parallel Technologies (APT), was a parallel computing software company founded in 1993 by Edward Zyszkowski, with the first employee being Rob Utzschneider. Torrent received initial funding from the NIST Advanced Technology Program.

Products

The company's product was a parallel flow-based programming system called Orchestrate. The product enabled users to assemble a program using predefined components (called operators) connected by virtual datasets  in a manner similar to Unix pipelines. Here is a simple example:

generator
  -records 50
  -schema record (recNum:    int32;
                  firstName: string[max=20];
                  lastName:  string[max=30];)
  |
peek
  -name -all

This script contains two operators: the generator operator (which creates test data) and the peek operator, which displays the contents of the records it receives. The generator will create 50 records, each with three fields; the peek operator will display their contents.

Torrent was acquired by Ascential Software in late 2001 for about $46 million; Orchestrate became part of Ascential's DataStage data integration system, which became part of IBM's Information Server product when Ascential was acquired by IBM in mid-2005.  Torrent technology became the Parallel Engine in the Information Server architecture.

References

Defunct software companies of the United States